Equipment operator (abbreviated as EO) is a  United States Navy occupational rating.

Equipment operators perform tasks involving deployment and operation of automotive, materials handling, weight lifting and construction equipment; direct and coordinate efforts of individuals and crews in execution of construction, earth‑moving, roadbuilding, quarrying, asphalt batching and paving, concrete batch plant operations, concrete paving and transit mixer operation assignments; maintain records and reports on mobile and stationary equipment and organize and supervise automotive and construction equipment pools; maintain individual combat readiness and perform tasks required in combat and disaster preparedness or recovery operations. 

At the master chief petty officer level, they merge with all other construction ratings as a master chief seabee (abbreviated as CBCM).

References
http://pavingquotesct.com/driveway-paving-ct/

See also
List of United States Navy ratings

United States Navy ratings